Prem Tame is a 2021 Bengali romance film directed and written by Anindya Chatterjee. It had a theatrical release on 12 February 2021.

Cast 

 Susmita Chatterjee as Raji
 Soumya Mukherjee as Pablo
 Sweta Mishra as Arshi
Baisakhi Marjit

Soundtrack

References

External links 
 

2021 films
Bengali-language Indian films
2020s Bengali-language films
Indian romance films
2021 romance films